Confidential, a joint venture between Foxtel and News Limited, is an Australian weekly entertainment news show. Talking about the latest in Australian gossip and celebrities. The program is based on the highly successful Confidential column in News Limited newspapers around the country, and is Australia's answer to E! News. The program made its debut on 6 June 2007.

Hosts and Reporters

Hosts
 Sophie Falkiner
 Mike Hammond
 Thomas Haynes
 Jonathan Pease

Reporters
The reporters are key News Limited Confidential reporters from newspapers around Australia.
 The Daily Telegraph (Sydney)
 Herald Sun (Melbourne)
 Chloe Adams
 Luke Dennehy
 Megan Miller
 The Courier-Mail (Brisbane)
 The Advertiser (Adelaide)
 The Sunday Times (Perth)

References

Fox8 original programming
Arena (TV network) original programming
2007 Australian television series debuts
Entertainment news shows